Ondřej Kyas (* 14 April 1979 Boskovice) is a Czech composer and musician.

Musical activities 
Ondřej Kyas graduated in Czech and Musicology from Masaryk University, Brno, Czech Republic. He is a co-founder and composer of the Ensemble Opera Diversa. He has written five full-length operas in Czech, Pickelhering 1607 aneb Nový Orfeus z Bohemie (Pickelhering 1607 or The New Orpheus of Bohemia, 2007), Společná smrt milenců v Šinagawě (The Strange Suicide of Two Lovers in Shinagawa, 2009), Dýňový démon ve vegetariánské restauraci (The Pumpkin Demon in a Vegetarian Restaurant, 2010), Ponava (Zmizelé řeky) (Ponava: The Lost Rivers, 2013) and Čaroděj a jeho sluha (The Conjuror and his Slave, 2016), as well as numerous shorter pieces.

He has also performed as a member of the following alternative and rock bands:
 Baron Obkrokin (1992-1996)
 Lunochod (c1995-2000)
 Nechere (c2001-2003)
 Hajzli (c1999-2001)
 U-Musik (c2004-2006)
 Prvouka (2005-2007)
 Cute Kid (2006-2007)
 Mucha (2014–)
 Květy (2016–, previously as a guest performer and studio musician)

He is also active as a solo performer, an "electrified songwriter" Kygiss. He is also member of the folk band Terebint.  Formerly he was a singer with the Czech Philharmonic Chorus.

Major works

Operas for the Ensemble Opera Diversa on Pavel Drábek's librettos
 Pickelhering 1607 aneb Nový Orfeus z Bohemie (Pickelhering 1607 or The New Orpheus of Bohemia, 2007), a comic chamber opera (100') for 9 singers and an 18-piece orchestra
 Společná smrt milenců v Šinagawě (The Strange Suicide of Two Lovers in Shinagawa, 2009), a half-evening poetic opera (65') for 5 singers and a 10-piece orchestra
 Dýňový démon ve vegetariánské restauraci (The Pumpkin Demon in a Vegetarian Restaurant, 2010), a gastronomical Gesamtkunstwerk for 4 solos, a Lucifer, a small kitchen chorus and a chamber orchestra (of 7)
 Ponava (Zmizelé řeky) (Ponava: The Lost Rivers, 2013), a poetic opera about the mysterious rivers under our feet
 Čaroděj a jeho sluha (The Conjuror and his Slave, 2016), a horror fairytale opera about serving in hell

A Musical
 Na dno (To the Very Bottom, 2015), a chamber musical for a graduating year at the JAMU (Janáček Academy of Music and Performing Arts)

Plays with Songs and Other Collaborations with Pavel Drábek
 Everyman čili Kdokoli (Everyman, 2013), a radio play by Pavel Drábek with Ondřej Kyas's songs, an adaptation of the late medieval morality play Everyman, commissioned and produced by the Czech Radio 3 Vltava (premiere broadcast on 23 April 2013; directed Hana Mikulášková, dramaturgy Hana Hložková)
 Everyman čili Kdokoli (Everyman, 2013), an adapted stage version play for the Ensemble Opera Diversa, directed by Tomáš Studený (premiere in August 2013)
 Leviatan (Leviathan, 2014), a play by Pavel Drábek, Lizzy Steel (McEllan) and Mark McLaughlin (McEllan) with Ondřej Kyas's songs, inspired by the short stories of Joseph Roth, produced by the Ensemble Opera Diversa, directed by Tomáš Studený (premiere in December 2014)
 Nissenův korál (Nissen's Jewel, 2016), a radio play by Pavel Drábek with songs by Ondřej Kyas, based on the stage play Leviatan, commissioned and produced by the Czech Radio 3 Vltava (premiere broadcast in September 2016; directed Hana Mikulášková, dramaturgy Hana Hložková)
 Princ Mucedorus a princezna Amadina (Prince Mucedorus and Princess Amadina, 2017), an original radio play by Pavel Drábek with Ondřej Kyas's music, based on the anonymous Elizabethan play Mucedorus (1598); commissioned and produced by the Czech Radio 2 Dvojka (premiere broadcast on 22 October 2017; directed by Lukáš Kopecký, dramaturgy Hana Hložková)

Instrumental compositions
 3 string quartets
 2 masses: 1. "rhythmic" (for mixed chorus, solos, organ, electric guitar, bass guitar and drums), 2. "sine Gloria" (for mixed chorus and organ)
 Magnificat (I) for pro solos, mixed chorus and string trio
 Magnificat (II, 2012) for mixed chorus and string orchestra; premiere recording available on YouTube
 Visions for 2 string quartets
 A triple concerto for flute, clarinet, bassoon and string orchestra (2006)
 Prázdné ulice (Empty Streets, 2008), a fantasy for string orchestra, inspired by Michal Ajvaz's eponymous novel
 Melodie (2009) for string orchestra
 Stabat mater (2010) for solos, two choruses and a chamber orchestra
 " Chamber Symphony No. 1" (2011) for string orchestra and three solo musicians
 Strange Kind of Happiness (2012) for piano quintet, commissioned by the Ensemble 10/10 (premiered by the Ensemble 10/10 on 15 June 2012 in Liverpool)

Orchestrations 
 Pavel Haas, Suite for Oboe and Piano, arranged for oboe and string orchestra (2015)
 Leoš Janáček, Šárka (1887 version) in a full instrumentation for chamber orchestra (2018)
 Pavel Haas, Šarlatán (The Charlatan, 1937, an opera), an instrumentation for chamber orchestra (2019)

Discography 
 Syntezátor ve dnech kdy spím, 2016

References

1979 births
Living people
Czech composers
Czech male composers